Carla Cerati (3 March 1926 Bergamo - 19 February 2016 Milan) was an Italian photographer and writer. She began her career focusing on social and cultural issues through her lens. Her work often depicted the bourgeois lifestyle of Milanese high society, and she was known for capturing intimate moments with her subjects. In 1974, she published "Mondo Cocktail," a photo book showcasing the lavish cocktail parties of Milan's elite, and in 1978, she released "Forma di donna," a collection of nude female portraits. She also worked as a fashion photographer and collaborated with various publications throughout her career. Cerati passed away in 2020, leaving a compelling and thought-provoking photography legacy.

Life 
In 1960 she began working as a still photographer, then devoted herself to reportage and portraiture . In 1962, she published her first works as a professional photographer, a report on Milanese schools, in the pages of the weekly L'Illustration Italiana, directed by Gaetano Tumiati. In the early Sixties, she frequented the  "Milanese Photographic Club" circles, an important point of reference for Italian photographic associations (founded in 1930), and in the following years, she published some of his photographs in Italian periodicals such as Vie nuove and L'Espresso .

At the theater, she photographed the comedy Nothing for Love by Oreste del Buono and the performances of the Compagnia dei Quattro by Franco Enriquez . Between 1967 and 1968, she photographed the Living Theater of Julian Beck and Judith Malina, in particular Antigone, Frankenstein and Paradise Now, the latter on the occasion of its international premiere at the Avignon Festival.

In 1969, the Einaudi publishing house published the book, Dying of class. The asylum condition photographed by Carla Cerati and Gianni Berengo Gardin edited by Franco Basaglia and Franca Basaglia Ongaro, where photographs were taken in the Italian psychiatric hospitals of Gorizia, Florence, Parma and Ferrara. Thanks to this project, with the passage of the law 13 May 1978 n. 180 (also known as the Basaglia Law ) in favor of closing the asylums, the two photographers won the Palazzi Prize for reportage. In 1998, the volume was republished with the title, Lest we forget 1968. The asylum reality of «To die of class».

Between the 1960s and 1970s, Cerati portrayed many personalities from the world of Italian and international culture and photographed some of the most important political and social events in Milan, such as the ongoing trial between Commissioner Luigi Calabresi and Lotta Continua , the feminist struggles, and the funeral of Giangiacomo Feltrinelli.

In 1974, she collaborated with publisher Amilcare Pizzi to release the photo book, "Mondo Cocktail." Maria Livia Serini provided an introductory note for the book which featured 61 photographs depicting the affluent lifestyle of Milanese cocktail parties. In 1978, Mazzotta published the photo book "Forma di donna," containing 34 photographs of female nudes.

As a writer, she made her debut in 1973 with the novel A fraternal love . In 1975 she published the novel A perfect marriage, finalist for the Campiello Prize . In 1977, she wrote the sentimental condition with which you win the "Radio Montecarlo Award". In 1990, she published Her bad daughter and she won the Comisso Prize .  In 1992, with The Loss of Diego, she became a finalist for the Strega Prize, while in 1996, with The Modeller's Friend , she won the Alghero National Prize for Literature and Journalism.in the narrative section. In 2004 he published the autobiographical novel L'intruso.

Works 

 
 
 
 
 
 
 
 
 
 
 
 
 
 
 
 

With others

 </ref>

References

Further reading
 Casero, C., & Muzzarelli, F. (2021). Feminism and Italian Photography: Notes on the Inheritance of New Generations from the 1970s. Journal of Asia-Pacific Pop Culture, 6(2), 262–294. 
 Grant, S. (2022). Caring for the Mind. In Soviet Nightingales: Care under Communism (pp. 157–185). Cornell University Press. 
 MOLLICA, R. F. (1985). RESISTING REFORM: Acknowledging the Effects of Good Psychiatry/Bad Psychiatry. International Journal of Mental Health, 14(1/2), 1–8. 
 PAPARO, F., & BACIGALUPI, M. (1985). THE ITALIAN PSYCHIATRIC EXPERIENCE: FURTHER CONSIDERATIONS. International Journal of Mental Health, 14(1/2), 93–104.

External links
 Carla Cerati,  AWARE.
 Carla Cerati. Institute of Languages, Cultures & Societies.

2016 deaths
Italian photographers